Alex Pascoe is a former Rhodesian international lawn bowler.

He won two bronze medals at the Commonwealth Games. He won his first of the two medals in the fours at the 1954 British Empire and Commonwealth Games in Vancouver with Alan Bradley, Fred Hockin and Ronnie Turner.

Four years later he another bronze in the fours with Basil Wells, Charles Bradley and Ronnie Turner at the 1958 Commonwealth Games.

References

Possibly living people
Zimbabwean male bowls players
Bowls players at the 1954 British Empire and Commonwealth Games
Bowls players at the 1958 British Empire and Commonwealth Games
Commonwealth Games bronze medallists for Southern Rhodesia
Commonwealth Games medallists in lawn bowls
Medallists at the 1954 British Empire and Commonwealth Games
Medallists at the 1958 British Empire and Commonwealth Games